Six ships of the French Navy have borne the name of Borée, in honour of Boreas.

French ships named Borée 

 , a 64-gun ship of the line
 , a 
 , a Téméraire-class ship of the line built on an updated design sometimes called Borée class.
 , a 
  (1901), an armoured Cyclone-class destroyer, briefly bore the name at the end of her career
 , a patrol boat of the French customs

See also

Notes and references

Notes

References

Bibliography 
 
 

French Navy ship names